"Homosapien" is a song by English musician Pete Shelley.  It was the first single from his album of the same title, released in 1981, and his first single as a solo performer after rising to fame with Buzzcocks.

Shelley wrote the song in 1974, before forming the Buzzcocks in 1976. Originally intended as a demo track for a Buzzcocks' song, "Homosapien" was recorded in one day with producer Martin Rushent, who would later go on to produce The Human League. The track adopted a synth pop sound in contrast to the Buzzcocks' harsh guitar riffs.

The single was a big hit in Australia and Canada, reaching the Top 10 in both territories, as well as being a modest hit in New Zealand.  Although it failed to cross over to singles charts in Europe or the United States, it was a popular dance track in clubs across both territories and reached number 14 on the Billboard Club Play Singles chart.

The song reportedly was banned by the BBC for its "explicit reference to gay sex" with the lyrics "homo superior / in my interior". Shelley denied this was the intention.  However according to then BBC Radio 1 DJ Annie Nightingale, "Its then risqué lyrics were noted at the time. Didn't stop me playing it on my radio show."

Lyrics
Lucas Hilderbrand, a professor at UC Irvine, sees "Homosapien" as a "curious pride anthem" that never uses the word "gay" in its lyrics, much like other tracks by queer artists from the time, for example Soft Cell's "Tainted Love" and Queen and David Bowie's "Under Pressure". Hilderbrand interprets the verse "and I just hope and pray / that the day / of our love is at hand... / And the world is so wrong / that I hope that we'll be strong..." as a message of solidarity against homophobia. Further, Hilderbrand reads "I don't wanna classify you like an animal in the zoo / But it seems good to me to know that you're Homosapien, too" as a statement on "refusing and then reconfirming identity categories", proclaiming a hope for gay rights but rejecting an "essentialist" label such as homosexual or gay.

Impact
Since its release, "Homosapien" has been a popular LGBT anthem, and was a gay club hit at the time it came out. Hilderbrand has described "Homosapien" as the "most homo-positive hit of" 1981.

Chart positions

Weekly charts

Year-end charts

References

Sources

1981 debut singles
Pete Shelley songs
LGBT-related songs
Songs written by Pete Shelley
1981 songs
Song recordings produced by Martin Rushent
Island Records singles